Hypsilurus is a genus of arboreal lizards in the family Agamidae. The genus is endemic to Melanesia.

Species
, Hypsilurus contains the following 18 species:
Hypsilurus auritus 
Hypsilurus binotatus  – two-marked forest dragon
Hypsilurus bruijnii  – Bruijn's forest dragon
Hypsilurus capreolatus 
Hypsilurus geelvinkianus  – New Guinea forest dragon
Hypsilurus godeffroyi  – northern forest dragon
Hypsilurus hikidanus  – Hikida's forest dragon
Hypsilurus longi  – Long's forest dragon
Hypsilurus macrolepis  
Hypsilurus magnus 
Hypsilurus modestus  – modest forest dragon
Hypsilurus nigrigularis 
Hypsilurus ornatus  – Denzer's forest dragon
Hypsilurus papuensis  – Papua forest dragon
Hypsilurus schoedei  – Vogt's forest dragon
Hypsilurus schultzewestrumi  
Hypsilurus spinosus  
Hypsilurus tenuicephalus 

Three species previously assigned to the genus Hypsilurus have now been moved to the genus Lophosaurus:
Hypsilurus boydii (Macleay, 1884) – Boyd's forest dragon
Hypsilurus dilophus (A.M.C. Duméril & Bibron, 1837) – Indonesian forest dragon
Hypsilurus spinipes (A.M.C. Duméril & A.H.A. Duméril, 1851) – southern forest dragon, southern angle-headed dragon

Nota bene: A binomial authority in parentheses indicates that the species was originally described in a genus other than Hypsilurus.

References

Further reading

Manthey U, Denzer W (2016). "Melanesian anglehead lizards of the genus Hypsilurus Peters, 1867 – Part 1: Species from New Guinea". Sauria 38 (3): 11–36.
Peters W (1867). "Über Flederthiere ... und Amphibien ( Hypsilurus ... )". Monatsberichte der Königlich-Preussischen Akademie der Wissenschaften zu Berlin 1867: 703–712. (Hypsilurus, new subgenus, pp. 707–708). (in German).

 
Lizard genera
Reptiles of Oceania
Taxa named by Wilhelm Peters